Mage most commonly refers to:

 Mage (paranormal) or magician, a practitioner of magic derived from supernatural or occult sources
 Mage (fantasy) or magician, a type of character in mythology, folklore, and fiction
Mage, a character class in some role-playing games
Mage (Dungeons & Dragons)

Mage(s) (or variations) may also refer to:

Arts and entertainment

Gaming
Mage: The Ascension, a 1993 role-playing game
Mage: The Sorcerers Crusade, a 1998 role-playing game
Mage: The Awakening, a 2005 role-playing game
Dark Ages: Mage, a 2002 role-playing game supplement
 Mages (company), a Japanese video game manufacturer

Other media
 Mage (comics), an American superhero comic book
Le Mage, an opera by Jules Massenet to a French libretto by Jean Richepin
 Kamen Rider Mage, a character in the TV series Kamen Rider Wizard

Places
 Mage, Myanmar, a village in Kachin State
 Magé, a municipality in Rio de Janeiro, Brazil
Magé River
Le Mage, Orne, a commune in the Orne department, France

Science and technology
 Melanoma-associated antigen, a gene family
 Multiplex Automated Genome Engineering, in genetic recombineering
 MAGE-OM and MAGE-TAB, standards by the FGED Society

Other uses
Eugène Mage (1837-1869), French naval officer and explorer of Africa
, the bun portion of a traditional Japanese hairstyle
Mage, a type of mask in ice hockey goaltending equipment

See also

Chonmage, a form of Japanese traditional topknot haircut worn by men
Magus (disambiguation)
Magi (disambiguation)
Magician (disambiguation)
Warlock (disambiguation)
Wizard (disambiguation)
Witch (disambiguation)
White wizard (disambiguation)
White Witch (disambiguation)